Long Harbour, also known as Tai Tan Hoi, is a natural harbour formed from an inlet of Mirs Bay to the north of Sai Kung Peninsula, Hong Kong.

Geography
The harbour is elongated in shape, with its mouth guarded by the island of Tap Mun. The inner stretch of the harbour is split into two arms by Tung Sam Kei Shan (Long Hill) at Tung Sam Kei Tsui. The East Arm, Chek Keng Hau, points to Chek Keng and the West Arm, Ko Tong Hau, points to Wong Ma Tei and Ngau Wu Tun.

Villages
Several remote settlements, without road access, exist on the shores of Long Harbour and the nearby islands, including Tap Mun, Wan Tsai and Chek Keng.

Other villages include:
 Ko Lau Wan
 Tai Tan
 Tan Ka Wan
 Tung Sam Kei

Transportation
Kai-to ferry routes operate to these from Wong Shek Pier, a road connected pier at the head of the West Arm, and Ma Liu Shui, on the MTR East Rail line near the new town of Sha Tin.

See also

List of harbours in Hong Kong

Tai Po District
Ports and harbours of Hong Kong
Sai Kung Peninsula